Angaria nhatrangensis is a species of sea snail, a marine gastropod mollusk in the family Angariidae.

Description

The shell can grow to be 35 mm to 65 mm in length.

Distribution
Angaria nhatrangensis can be found off of Vietnam.

References

External links

Angariidae
Gastropods described in 2006